The Moskvitch-2141, also known under the trade name Aleko (Russian: "АЛЕКО", derivative from the name of the automaker "Автомобильный завод имени Ленинского Комсомола", Avtomobilny zavod imeni Leninskogo Komsomola, meaning "Automotive Factory of Lenin's Komsomol"), is a Russian mid-size car that was first announced in 1985 and sold in the Soviet Union and its successor states between 1986 and 1997 by the now defunct Moskvitch Company, based in Moscow, Russia. It was replaced by the modernised M-2141-02 Svyatogor and its sedan body version, the M-2142, in 1997–2003.

The Aleko was a huge improvement over previous Moskvitch models, which were durable but old-fashioned sedans (saloons) and station wagons (estates) with rear-wheel drive and a solid rear axle, and had no common parts with them apart from the engine and some other minor details.

Features

The new car had such innovative features as front-wheel drive, a hatchback body style, MacPherson strut front suspension and torsion-crank rear suspension. It had rack-and-pinion steering and a collapsible steering column. The spare tyre was located underneath the boot and was accessible from outside, in the tradition of French cars. The wheelbase went up almost , the body got  wider, the wheel size went up one inch (14 inches). The car became more spacious, comfortable and safe. For the first time in the history of Soviet and Russian car making, the car's profile was optimized for aerodynamics, with the help of Russian and, partially, French engineers, who shortly cooperated with them at the final stage of the development process. The officially reported drag coefficient was 0.35.

History

Before the development of the M-2141 started, Moskvitch engineers had been working on a new series of rear-wheel drive cars and had developed it to the stage of pre-production prototypes. However, surprisingly for them, the Minister of Automobile Industry required them to cease all work on the unfinished project and instead create a front-wheel drive car with its upper part identical to that of the French Simca 1307, which was favoured by him. While this decision helped to cut the development costs, it came as an insult to the engineers and designers, who had their own mock-ups of the future car ready. Designer Igor Zaytsev recalled that it took more than a month to motivate his disappointed colleagues to get involved in the new project.

However, besides the fact that the AZLK designers considered it "insulting and humiliating" to copy an existing car, it came out that the new powertrain and chassis required a different bodyshell, and despite the two cars having similar shapes, the only parts of the French car that were borrowed to the Moskvitch-2141 were some constructive elements of the roof and the form of the window seals. As the company's chief designer Yuri Tkachenko stated in 1992, the differences between the Simca and the M-2141 were so numerous and significant that it was more correct to say what details were borrowed from the Simca rather than what was added to its design. It is only the top of the body that these models have in common. The existing engine was too long for transverse placement, so it was placed longitudinally, like on the Renault 20/30 or Audi 80/100 series.

The Aleko turned out to be quite a breakthrough for the Soviet automotive industry of its time. It almost became the first front-wheel drive hatchback of the Soviet Union, but due to the fact that its development took a further two years for Moskvitch to set up the manufacturing, the Lada Samara arrived first.
Although the M-2141 had a more comfortable design than the Samara, the dissolution of the Soviet Union in 1991 followed by an economic crisis, financial mismanagement and disruptions in the work of the company caused a decline in assembling quality in the 1990s and damaged the reputation of this car in the markets. Nonetheless, even then, it was still praised for a high level of passive safety, robustness of construction, good off-road capabilities, and ease of repair. In 2001 the aging M-2141, designed in the late 1970s and early 1980s and lacking modern airbags and seatbelts with pretensioners, was awarded zero stars out of a possible four by the new Russian ARCAP safety assessment program, but the reviewers pointed out that for a 20-year-old car it showed an "excellent" crash-test result. The steering column and the A-pillar were displaced less than in the Citroën Xantia and early Audi A4.

Before 1991, AZLK designers also created the four-wheel-drive Moskvich-21416SE and a sedan version of the M-2141 equipped with a different steering wheel and an electronic instrument cluster that was publicly demonstrated in 1990, but none of these cars were put into series production due to the hardships brought by the collapse of the Soviet Union. Although AZLK had designed and fully tested a new and more powerful generation of four-cylinder gasoline and diesel engines for the M-2141, the construction of the company's engine production plant was stopped and never resumed.

The Aleko was sold mostly on the domestic market, but in the late 1980s it was exported too. In some export markets, including France and Germany, the cars were advertised as the Lada Aleko, and diesel engines from Ford and Indenor could be delivered in addition to the standard petrol engines. The Aleko was also assembled in Bulgaria under licence for a brief period in the late 1980s.
Some of the last Moskvitch models to be built were the upgraded Alekos that were renamed to Svyatogor (models M-214122, M-214100, M-214145) and the M-2142, Dolgorukiy (1997–2002). They were also based on the design of the M-2141.

Alternative names of the original car and modifications
Aleko 141 (for foreign market)
Moskvich-2141 (for domestic market, in Latin alphabet)
Москвич-2141 (for domestic market, in Russian Cyrillic)
AZLK-2141 (for domestic market, in Latin alphabet)
АЗЛК-2141 (for domestic market, in Russian Cyrillic alphabet)
Svjatogor (since 1997, for domestic market, in Latin alphabet)
Святогор (since 1997, for domestic market, in Russian Cyrillic alphabet)
АЗЛК-214145 (since 1997, Renault F3R 2.0 engine)

Gallery

References

Cars of Russia
Moskvitch
Soviet automobiles
1990s cars
2000s cars
Cars introduced in 1986
Hatchbacks
Mid-size cars
ARCAP large family cars
Front-wheel-drive vehicles
Cars discontinued in 2003